Liubiju is the oldest Beijing's sauce garden, the first written record is from 1530, in Chinese eras it is Ming Dynasty Jiajing Emperor's ninth year. A regular business started in Kangxi Emperor years of the  Qing Dynasty, 1661-1722. Liubuju is well known for its sauce (yellow soybean paste and sweet soy sauce) and pickles.

History and legend 
The most recognized story about the shop origin is that it was founded by 3 brothers from Linfen city in Shanxi province of the North China. Zhao Cunren, Zhao Cunyi and Zhao Cunli ran a small shop with daily necessities (as the saying: "Open the door to seven things: wood, rice, oil, salt, sauce, vinegar, tea.")

Pickles are not brined, but prepared in different seasons. All kinds of sauces made with soybean are sold in bottles, jars and pouches.

See also 
List of oldest companies

References 

Article contains translated text from 北京六必居食品有限公司 on the Chinese Wikipedia retrieved on 10 March 2017.

External links 
Introduction on TimeOut Beijing
Liubiju: A Nearly 500-year-old Pickle Maker

Chinese pickles
Companies based in Beijing
Culture in Beijing
Companies established in the 16th century